City Center (also LIC City Center for sponsorship reasons) is a metro station that serves the City Center shopping mall area in Salt Lake City, Kolkata. It is on Kolkata Metro line 2. This elevated structure is located near Labony Estate, Salt Lake.

The Station

Layout

Connections

Auto

Bus 
Bus route number 44A, 206, 211B, 215A/1, 260, KB16, KB22, K1, S171 (Mini), S16, S30A, S60 etc. serve the station.

Air 
Netaji Subhash Chandra Bose International Airport is 10.4 km via VIP Road.

Entry/Exits

References 

Kolkata Metro stations
Railway stations in Kolkata